Ian Huntington OAM (born 18 October 1931) is an Australian former cricketer. He played 46 first-class cricket matches for Victoria between 1953 and 1964.

Huntington was awarded the Medal of the Order of Australia in the 1991 Australia Day Honours List for service to junior cricket administration.

See also
 List of Victoria first-class cricketers

References

External links
 

1931 births
Living people
Australian cricketers
Victoria cricketers
Cricketers from Melbourne
Recipients of the Medal of the Order of Australia